Cellulomonas terrae is a Gram-positive, polysaccharide-degrading, cellulolytic, xylanolytic and non-motile bacterium from the genus Cellulomonas which has been isolated from soil from Daejeon in Korea.

References

 

Micrococcales
Bacteria described in 2005